Pool A of the First Round of the 2009 World Baseball Classic was held at Tokyo Dome, Tokyo, Japan from March 5 to 9, 2009.

Pool A was a modified double-elimination tournament. The winners for the first games matched up in the second game, while the losers faced each other in an elimination game. The winners of the elimination game then played the losers of the non-elimination game in another elimination game. The remaining two teams then played each other to determine seeding for the Pool 1.

Bracket

Results
All times are Japan Standard Time (UTC+09:00).

Japan 4, China 0

South Korea 9, Chinese Taipei 0

China 4, Chinese Taipei 1

Japan 14, South Korea 2

South Korea 14, China 0

South Korea 1, Japan 0

External links
Official website

Pool A
World Baseball Classic Pool A
World Baseball Classic Pool A
International baseball competitions hosted by Japan
World Baseball Classic Pool A
Sports competitions in Tokyo